Argiope aetherea is a common, large orb-web spider (family Araneidae). Like other species of Argiope, it is commonly known as the St Andrew's Cross spider, due to the characteristic cross-shaped web decorations female spiders often include in their webs. A. aetherea is similar in appearance to A. keyserlingi, however female A. aetherea are generally larger than A. keyserlingi. Like most orb-web spiders, A. aetherea shows considerable sexual size dimorphism, with females being many times larger than males.

Distribution
Argiope aetherea is found from China to Australia.

Subspecies
There exists a subspecies from New Guinea:
 Argiope aetherea annulipes Thorell, 1881

Gallery

References

aetherea
Spiders of Australia
Spiders of Asia
Spiders described in 1841